The Cowboy Marching Band is the marching band of Oklahoma State University.

History
The first band at Oklahoma A&M College (now Oklahoma State University) was organized in 1905 by Harry Dunn, a student at the school, and directed by a Mr. Wood. It consisted of 22 members.

A tradition of the band was the use of the OSU Spirit Drum. It was purchased in the mid-1930s for the R.O.T.C. band. It was believed to be the largest drum in the country at that time.

Directors since 1981
Dr. Richard Kastendieck (1981-1986)
Gregory Talford (1986-1987)
William Ballenger (1987-1992)
Glen J. Hemberger (1992-1997)
Dr. Michael A. Raiber (1997-2000)
David Wick (2000-2001)
Bradley J. Genevro (2001-2004)
Dr. Paul W. Popiel (2004-2006)
Dr. D. Bradley Snow (2006-2010)
Dr. Doug Henderson (2010-2020)
Dr. Tyler Austin (2020-2022)
Dr. Phil Vallejo (2022-present)

References

External links
 Official website
 Oklahoma State Alumni Band Association

Big 12 Conference marching bands
Cowboy Marching Band
Musical groups from Oklahoma
Musical groups established in 1905
1905 establishments in Oklahoma Territory